Vaptsarov (Bulgarian: Вапцаров) is a Bulgarian masculine surname, its feminine counterpart is Vaptsarova. The surname may refer to
Katsi Vaptsarov (born 1963), Bulgarian television host and film director
Nikola Vaptsarov (1909–1942), Bulgarian poet, communist and revolutionary
Nikola Vaptsarov Naval Academy in Varna, Bulgaria
Vaptsarov Peak in Antarctica

Bulgarian-language surnames